Lizette Cabrera and Julia Grabher were the defending champions but chose not to participate.

Despina Papamichail and Camilla Rosatello won the title, defeating Francisca and Matilde Jorge in the final, 4–6, 6–2, [10–6].

Seeds

Draw

Draw

References

External links
Main Draw

Internazionali Femminili di Tennis Città di Caserta - Doubles